Ghazi Khan (Balochi, Urdu ) was a Baloch mercenary from who moved to Multan in the late 15th century at the behest of the Langah Sultanate.  He was accompanied by his sons, Ghazi Khan, Fatih Khan and Ismail Khan.

The Derajat had its existence as an historical area to the Baloch immigration in the fifteenth century. Sultan Husain, the Langah dynasty's Sultans of Multan, being unable to hold his trans-Indus possessions, called in Baloch mercenaries, and assigned these territories to Haji Khan.

Tomb of Ghazi Khan

The tomb of Ghazi Khan, locally called as handeera in Balochi was built in the beginning of 15th century. This seems like the tomb of Shah Rukn-e-Alam in Multan. It is located in the Mulla Quaid Shah Graveyard. Its main gate is from eastern side and two small doors are in side of north and south. There are 28 ladders from northern side in the internal side. The graveyard was built up around the tomb of Ghazi Khan. This is the oldest building in the city. The tomb condition is continuously deteriorating and many social activists are raising voice to preserve this heritage.

List of places after his name
 Dera Ghazi Khan, a city in Pakistan
 Ghazi Ghat, a village in Muzaffargarh, Pakistan

List of institutions after his name
 Ghazi University
 Ghazi Khan Medical College

List of companies and organizations after his name
 Al-Ghazi Tractors
 Ghazi Textile Mills
 DG cement factory Ltd

See also 
 Mirani dynasty
 Dera Ghazi Khan
 Derajat
 Dodai tribe
 Mian (tribe)

References

Baloch people
City founders
People from Dera Ghazi Khan District